is a railway station on the Ainokaze Toyama Railway Line in Asahi, Toyama, Japan, operated by the third-sector railway operator Ainokaze Toyama Railway.

Lines
Many through services from the neighbouring Echigo Tokimeki Railway Nihonkai Hisui Line terminate at Tomari, with both Echigo Tokimeki Railway trains and Ainokaze Toyama Railway trains using Platform 2 to provide a same-platform transfer.

Station layout 
Tomari Station has one side platform and one  island platform connected by a footbridge. The station is staffed.

Platforms

History

The station opened on 16 April 1910. With the privatization of Japanese National Railways (JNR) on 1 April 1987, the station came under the control of JR West.

From this date, Tomari Station was transferred to the ownership of the Ainokaze Toyama Railway.

Adjacent stations

Passenger statistics
In fiscal 2015, the station was used by an average of 711 passengers daily (boarding passengers only).

Surrounding area 
 National Route 8
 Asahi Town Hall
Tomari Post Office

See also
 List of railway stations in Japan

References

External links

  

Railway stations in Toyama Prefecture
Railway stations in Japan opened in 1910
Ainokaze Toyama Railway Line
Asahi, Toyama